Abyan is a governorate of Yemen.  The Abyan region was historically part of the Fadhli Sultanate.  It was a base to the Aden-Abyan Islamic Army militant group. Its capital is the city of Zinjibar.  This governorate is noted for its agriculture, in particular the cultivation of date palms and animal husbandry.

On 31 March 2011, Al Bawaba reported that Al-Qaeda in the Arabian Peninsula (AQAP) had declared Abyan an "Al-Qaeda Emirate in Yemen" after seizing control of the region. The New York Times reported that those in control, while Islamic militants, are not in fact Al-Qaeda. This takeover was confirmed on May 28. Yemeni government forces launched an effort to re-establish control of the region, resulting in the Battle of Zinjibar.

In addition to Zinjibar, the towns of Jaʿār and Shuqrah were firmly under the control of the Islamists. In early May 2012 the Yemeni Army and Southern Resistance began a major offensive to wrest control of the province from militants. Government forces captured Zinjibar and Jaar on 12 June after a month of heavy fighting. Militants reportedly retreated towards the town of Shuqrah. In 2017, a military campaign led by Southern security forces and Southern resistance could free Abyan from the Islamist militants who escaped to their mountains in the Al Bayda and Marib Governorates.

Geography

Adjacent governorates
 Aden Governorate (southwest)
 Al Bayda Governorate (north)
 Lahij Governorate (west)
 Shabwa Governorate (north, east)

Districts
Abyan Governorate is divided into the following 11 districts. These districts are further divided into sub-districts, and then further subdivided into villages:

 Ahwar District
 Al Mahfad District
 Al Wade'a District
 Jayshan District
 Khanfir District
 Lawdar District
 Mudiyah District
 Rasad District
 Sarar District
 Sibah District
 Zinjibar District

Settlements
Abu `amir  Ad dirjajAd diyyuAhl fashshashAhl fulaysAhmad ash shaykhAl `alamAl bahitahAl habilAl hamamAl hisnAl jawlAl kawdAl kawrAl khamilahAl khawrAl ma`arAl ma`jalahAl mahalAl mahlajAl makhzan al fawqiAl makhzan al qa`iAl masani`Al qarnAl qashabahAl qurna`ahAn nashshAr rawdahAr rawwaAs samnAs sarriyahAs suda'Ash sha`bahAsh sharafAsh sharqiyahAt tariyahAth thalib`Ali hadi`Amudiyah`Arabah`Arqub umm kubayr`Aryab`Aslan`AwrumahBa taysBa zulayfahBarkanBathanBayt samnahDor SalamahFar`anFarisJa`arJahrahJawf umm maqbabahJiblat al farajJiblat al waznahJiblat badrJirshabKabaranKadamat al fayshKawd al `abadilKawkabKawrat halimahKhabt al aslumKhanfarKhubanKuwashiLawdarMaghadihMakrarahMansabMaqasirMaqdahMarta`ahMasadi`ahMishalMudiyahMukayrasMunabMusaymirNa`abNa`bNamirNaq`alQarn al wadi`Qaryat ahl hidranQaryat husayn umm muhammadSakin ahl hidranSakin ahl mahathithSakin ahl sadahSakin ahl wuhayshSakin hazmSakin wu`aysSayhanShams ad dinShaykh `abdallahShaykh salimShubramShuqrahShurjanThirahWadibahZinjibarZughaynah

References

 
Governorates of Yemen